Isoma Karyon is a village in the municipality of Megalopoli, Arcadia, Greece. It is situated in the eastern foothills of mount Lykaion, at 470 m elevation. It is 2 km northwest of Kato Karyes, 6 km south of Karytaina and 8 km northwest of Megalopoli.

Population

See also

List of settlements in Arcadia

References

External links
 Isoma Karyon on GTP Travel Pages

Megalopolis, Greece
Populated places in Arcadia, Peloponnese